Anchor was the name of a community located in southeastern Pointe Coupee Parish, Louisiana, United States. The community was located along the Mississippi River, north of the Pointe Coupee - West Baton Rouge Parish line.

History
The community received its name during the American Civil War.  A post office was established in the community in 1888.  The post office was closed in 1930.

References

Populated places in Pointe Coupee Parish, Louisiana
Baton Rouge metropolitan area
Ghost towns in Louisiana